Rosulje may refer to:

 Rosulje (Bugojno), a village in Bosnia and Herzegovina
 Rosulje (Gornji Vakuf), a village in Bosnia and Herzegovina
 Rosulje (Pale), a village in Bosnia and Herzegovina
 Rosulje, Tešanj, a village in Bosnia and Herzegovina